The 1936 AFL season is the first season of the second American Football League, the formation of which was announced by Harry March, former personnel director of the NFL's New York Giants, on December 15, 1935. Fifteen cities bid for charter franchises; on April 11, 1936, franchises were awarded to eight cities: Boston, Cleveland, Jersey City, New York, Philadelphia, Pittsburgh, Providence, and Syracuse. By mid-summer, Jersey City, Philadelphia, and Providence withdrew; soon afterwards, Rochester was given a franchise, only to have it relocated to Brooklyn, despite the lack of availability of a home stadium at the time.

The league began its existence by raiding NFL rosters for its players, with a new New York Yankees team signing members of the New York Giants, the Cleveland Rams taking Chicago Bears star Damon Wetzel as their coach, and the Pittsburgh Americans snaring members of the crosstown Pirates. On the other hand, eventual AFL champions Boston Shamrocks pretty much ignored the roster of the crosstown Boston Redskins, while the Brooklyn Tigers and Syracuse Braves opted for "home grown" talent.

The race to the 1936 AFL championship quickly narrowed down to three teams (Boston, Cleveland, and New York) as the Syracuse team was moved to Rochester after a deafening lack of fan support while it lost almost every game. The former Syracuse Braves became the Rochester Braves in early October 1936 — and folded after their game on November 1. Two weeks later, the Brooklyn Tigers moved to Rochester and became the Rochester Tigers. The two Rochester teams finished in the bottom of the league standings.

In contrast to the following year, the majority of the AFL had winning records in 1936 (the two Rochester teams had one win combined). The Pittsburgh Americans finished with a 3-2-1 record despite averaging only 2500 fans in the Forbes Field stands; the Boston Shamrocks (8-3-0) won the title by defeating both the Cleveland Rams (5-2-2) and the New York Yankees (5-3-2) in the season's final weeks.

Final standings

See also
 1936 NFL season
 1936 Cleveland Rams season
 1937 American Football League season

References

American Football League (1936)
American Football League